Lithgow power station was an Australian power station built in 1928 to supply power to the New South Wales Government Railways, the small arms factory, Hoskins mine and Lithgow council. The initial plant was two 2.5MW BTH/English Electric turbo alternators that were no longer needed at Ultimo power station. A third 2.5MW turbo alternator from Zarra Street, Newcastle was added in 1931. A fourth 2.5MWBTH machine was installed in 1936 (ex Zarra St). In 1943 a 2.5MW Willans & Robinson generator from Zarra St became No5 at Lithgow. Steam was supplied from four 160,000 lb/Hr boilers at 200PSI and a temp of 450degF. Coal came from the nearby State Mine. Due to a severe lack of water, these turbines only exhausted into individual jet condensers.

The second stage of Lithgow power station development started in 1948 with the removal of No5 which had been damaged and the installation of a 7.5MW Metro-Vickers alternator from Zarra St and became No4A. Similar 7.5MW Metro Vickers generators replaced the 2.5MW machines in 1950, 1953 and 1956 to become No. 3A, No. 5, No. 2 and No. 1. Steam was supplied from five 70,000 lb/hr boilers that were ex White Bay "A" station. A series of wooden cooling towers were constructed and allowed the use of surface condensers for these larger sets. Make-up for the cooling towers came from a new dam built at the adjacent State Mine. Total output was 38MW.

Walter Lockhart Cowen, district electrical superintendent for New South Wales Government Railways, managed the Lithgow Power Station from its construction phase until his retirement in 1951. The station remained in operation until 1964, by which time the nearby Wallerawang Power Station was running. The Lithgow Power Station was demolished during the 1970s.

References 

 
 

1928 establishments in Australia
1964 disestablishments in Australia
Coal-fired power stations in New South Wales
Lithgow, New South Wales